I'm a Celebrity...Get Me Out of Here! returned for its twenty-second series on 6 November 2022 on ITV1. The series returned to Murwillumbah, New South Wales, Australia, for the first time since 2019, following the easing of travel restrictions surrounding the COVID-19 pandemic. Ant & Dec returned to present the series.

On 27 November, Jill Scott was crowned the new queen of the jungle, with Owen Warner finishing in second place and Matt Hancock in third place.

Production
Due to the COVID-19 pandemic in Australia, the twentieth and twenty-first series were filmed at Gwrych Castle in Abergele, Wales. Following the conclusion of the latter, media speculation began as to whether the series would return to Australia. It was also confirmed that ITV would film an "All-Stars" series in South Africa, featuring former campmates and scheduled to air in 2023. However, it was stated that the series would be used as a back up option if the show was unable to return to Australia. 

In August 2022, it was confirmed that the series would return to Australia for the first time since the nineteenth series. Prior to the series, it was announced that Bob McCarron, known informally as "Medic Bob", who had been the show's medic since its inception, would not be returning to the series. 

On 7 October 2022, ITV released the first trailer for the series, a ten-second teaser featuring a helicopter flying through the sky on the way to Australia, as Donnelly exclaims "Where is the luggage going?" with McPartlin replying "It's meeting us there". A full-length trailer was released a week later, depicting Ant & Dec parachuting out of a helicopter into the jungle surrounded by camp essentials.

The series began on 6 November, a week earlier than usual due to the 2022 FIFA World Cup.

Celebrities
The line-up was announced by ITV on 31 October 2022. The following day, it was confirmed that Conservative Party politician Matt Hancock would be joining the line-up as a late arrival, a decision that was widely criticised by the media and ultimately led to his suspension from the Conservative parliamentary group and its whip. Stand-up comedian Seann Walsh was later confirmed as the second late arrival and entered the jungle alongside Hancock on 8 November.

On 7 November, model Olivia Attwood was forced to withdraw from the series for medical reasons, with a spokesperson stating that "the medical team has advised it is not safe for [Attwood] to return to camp as there needs to be further investigation." Attwood later confirmed that she had been forced to leave after undergoing blood tests which determined she was anaemic.

Results and elimination
 Indicates that the celebrity was immune from the vote
 Indicates that the celebrity received the most votes from the public, and was crowned the winner
 Indicates that the celebrity received the 2nd most votes from the public, and was the runner up.
 Indicates that the celebrity received the fewest votes and was eliminated immediately (no bottom two)
 Indicates that the celebrity was named as being in the bottom two
 Indicates that the celebrity withdrew from the competition

 The public voted for who they wanted to win, rather than save.

Bushtucker trials
The contestants take part in daily trials to earn food. These trials aim to test both physical and mental abilities. The winner is usually determined by the number of stars collected during the trial, with each star representing a meal earned by the winning contestant for their fellow campmates.

 The public voted for who they wanted to face the trial
 The contestants decided who would face the trial
 The trial was compulsory and neither the public nor celebrities decided who took part

 A public vote opened a week before the series began, to determine who would become Jungle VIPs (Very Isolated People); these were ultimately Olivia and Boy George, who each had to choose a plus one to accompany them, and they chose Chris and Scarlette respectively. They spent the first night on a deserted island, away from the main camp, and ultimately faced the first Trial.
 Boy George, Mike and Sue were exempt from this Trial.
 Babatúndé was exempt from this Trial.
 Sue was exempt from this Trial.
 For this Trial, the celebs were be competing to win balls, rather than stars, to see which 3 celebs will win a luxury BBQ on the beach. Jill, Matt and Sue's balls were drawn.
 For this Trial, three celebrities were chosen at random from the tombola by Ant & Dec.
 For this Trial, each celebrity were competing for starters, main courses, desserts, drinks, and treats of their choice.

Star count

Deals on Wheels challenges
As well as competing in the Bushtucker trials, celebrities have to complete in 'Deals on Wheels challenges' (formerly 'Dingo Dollar Challenges') in order to earn treats for the camp. At least two celebrities are chosen to compete in the challenge. These are often mental challenges, rather than challenges including critters. They must complete the challenge they have been given in order to win 'Dingo Dollars'.

After completion of the challenge, the celebrities will take the Dingo Dollars and purchase a snack option (formerly campmates were able to pick between two options) from Kiosk Kev (Mark Herlaar), who rides in on a bicycle. Before they are allowed to take the prize, the other celebrities back at the living quarters must answer a trivia question. If they get the question right, they will earn the treat, but if they get it wrong, the celebrities will go back empty-handed.

 The celebrities got the question correct
 The celebrities got the question wrong
 No question was given, as the celebrities failed to complete the challenge in time.

 As Owen and Scarlette failed to complete the challenge within the time limit, they failed the task, meaning they did not win the dollars and therefore no question was asked.
 This was not a traditional challenge and did not feature Kiosk Kev, but rather the remaining celebrities having to attribute quotes that had been said during the series to a contestant. The celebrities matched all quotes correctly and therefore won portions of treats that had not been previously won.

Ratings
Official ratings are taken from BARB, utilising the four-screen dashboard which includes viewers who watched the programme on laptops, smartphones and tablets within 7 days of the original broadcast.

References

2022 British television seasons 
22
Television shows filmed in Australia
Matt Hancock